

Medal table

Lebanese medals by sport

Lebanese Medal winners

Medalists

External links
 https://web.archive.org/web/20140624045926/http://www.cijm.org.gr/images/stories/pdf/JM1963.pdf

Nations at the 1963 Mediterranean Games
Lebanon at the Mediterranean Games
1963 in Lebanese sport